Footscray Capri (Footscray Capri Soccer Club) is a defunct Australian football (soccer) club that was based in Footscray, Victoria.  The club was founded in 1958 by migrants from Italy.

Statistics by season

Honours
Victorian League 1 Division North Champions 1958

International players
  Robert Wemyss

References

Defunct soccer clubs in Australia
Association football clubs established in 1950
Association football clubs disestablished in 1961
Soccer clubs in Melbourne
1950 establishments in Australia
1961 disestablishments in Australia
Footscray JUST
Italian-Australian culture in Melbourne
Italian-Australian backed sports clubs of Victoria
Victorian State League teams